Portnahinch or Portnehinch ( is a barony in County Laois (formerly called Queen's County or County Leix), Ireland.

Etymology

The barony is named after the townland of Portnahinch (Port na hInse; "port of the island").

Geography
Portnahinch is located in the northeastern part of County Laois.

History

Portnahinch formed part of the ancient Kingdom of Uí Failghe.

List of settlements

Below is a list of settlements in Portnahinch barony:
Ballybrittas
Emo
Mountmellick
Portarlington

References

Baronies of County Laois